The Secretary of State for Foreign Affairs was one of the four or five specialized secretaries of state in France during the Ancien Régime. The Secretary of State for Foreign Affairs became a Minister of Foreign Affairs in 1791.

See also
For a list of secretaries, see: Minister of Foreign Affairs.
 Secretary of State (Ancien Régime)
 Secretary of State of the Maison du Roi
 Secretary of State for War (France)
 Secretary of State of the Navy (France)
 Secretary of State for Protestant Affairs
 Ancien Régime in France
 Early Modern France

 Foreign